The Birth and Death of the Sun is a popular science book by theoretical physicist and cosmologist George Gamow, first published in 1940, exploring atomic chemistry, stellar evolution, and cosmology. The book is illustrated by Gamow. It was revised in 1952.

Reception
Critical reception has been positive. In February 1941, Gerard F. W. Mulders gave a favorable review for The Birth and Death of the Sun, writing that "[i]t gives authentic information in nontechnical language from which mathematical formulae have been completely eliminated. The entertaining presentation of the most modern developments in physics and astrophysics, the sparkling humor, and the original drawings and graphs will be enjoyed by scientist and amateur alike."

In April 2015, physicist and Nobel laureate Steven Weinberg included The Birth and Death of the Sun in a personal list of "the 13 best science books for the general reader".

See also
 Formation and evolution of the Solar System

References

External links 
 

Popular physics books
Astronomy books
1940 non-fiction books